Twenty-three suspected Al-Qaeda members escaped from a Yemen prison in 2006. The escape is notable because the escapees included several individuals imprisoned for their participation in the USS Cole bombing. Gaber Al-Bana’a was believed to be an American citizen, who traveled to an Afghan training camp with some friends who became known as the Lackawanna Six or Buffalo Six, when they were rounded up as a "sleeper cell".

The prisoners escaped through a 140-metre tunnel.

Escapees

According to the Yemen Times the escapees were:
Yaser Naser Al-Homikani
Mohammed Sa’eed Al-Omda
Fawzi Mohammed Al-Wajeh
Zakria Hasen Al-Baihani
Abudlrahman Ahmed Basora
Abdullah Ahmed Al-Remi
Fawaz Yahya Al-Rabe ai
Hizam Saleh Mugli
Gamal Mohammed Al-Badwi
Nasir al-Wuhayshi
Abdulrahman Ahmed Basurah
Ibrahim Mohammed Al-Hoidi
Ibrahim Mohammed Al-Mukri
Aref Saleh Mugli
Shafik Ahmed Zaid
Gaber Al-Bana’a
Hamza Salem Al-Kuaiti
Omer Sa’eed Gar Allah
Abdullah Yahya Al-Wa’adi
Khaled Mohammed Al-Batati
Kasem Yahya Al-Remi
Mohammed Ahmed Al-Remi
Mansour Naser al-Bahani

References

Crime in Yemen
Law of Yemen
2006 crimes in Yemen
National security in Yemen
Yemen